The Janata Dal (Secular) is an Indian political party led by former prime minister of India, H. D. Deve Gowda. The party is recognized as a State Party in the states of Karnataka, Kerala and Arunachal Pradesh. It was formed in July 1999 by the split of Janata Dal party. It has a political presence mainly in Karnataka. In Kerala, the party is a part of the Left Democratic Front (LDF).

History

The Janata Dal (Secular), formed in 1999, had its origins in the Janata Party, founded in 1977 as a coalition of several smaller parties that combined forces to oppose the Indian National Congress. In 1988 the Janata Party and other smaller parties merged to form the Janata Dal. In 1996, Janata Dal reached its pinnacle when H. D. Deve Gowda became Prime Minister of India, heading the United Front (UF) coalition government.

The Janata Dal split in 1999, when a faction led by Chief Minister J. H. Patel lent support to the Bharatiya Janata Party-led National Democratic Alliance leading to the formation of Janata Dal (Secular) under H. D. Deve Gowda and Siddaramaiah. The Sharad Yadav faction of the Janata Dal, the Lok Shakti and the Samata Party merged as the Janata Dal (United). Even though the premise for the split was its opposition to allying with the National Democratic Alliance, H. D. Deve Gowda stayed equally away from the Indian National Congress from the outset.

The 2004 Karnataka Assembly election witnessed the revival of the party's fortunes with JD(S) becoming part of the ruling coalition in the state.

On 14 April 2015, the JD(S), Janata Dal (United), Rashtriya Janata Dal, the Indian National Lok Dal, Samajwadi Party, and Samajwadi Janata Party (Rashtriya) announced that they would merge into a new national Janata Parivar alliance in order to oppose the BJP, thus leaving the UPA.

Prominent members

 H. D. Deve Gowda, President of Janata Dal (Secular), former prime minister of India and former chief minister of Karnataka
 H. D. Kumaraswamy, former chief minister of Karnataka, son of former prime minister of India H. D. Deve Gowda, and former Karnataka State president of Janata Dal (Secular)
 Gegong Apang, former chief minister of Arunachal Pradesh
 C. M. Ibrahim,current Karnataka State president of Janata Dal (Secular)
 C. K. Nanu, state president of JD(S) Kerala, former minister Govt. of Kerala and MLA
 H. D. Revanna, former cabinet minister, present MLA, Karnataka (son of H. D. Deve Gowda).
 Nikhil Gowda, state president, Yuva Janata Dal (Secular)
 Prajwal Revanna, MP of Hassan; Lok Sabha leader of Janata Dal (Secular).
 B. M. Farooq, current MLC of Karnataka Legislative Council, current national general secretary Of Janata Dal (Secular)
 C. S. Puttaraju, former minister for small irrigation resources, and former member of parliament, Lok Sabha from Mandya
 GT Devegowda, former minister for higher education, and member of the Legislative Assembly (MLA) from Chamundeshwari (Vidhana Sabha constituency
 Oommen Thalavady, former MLA Kuttanad, Kerala Legislative Assembly 
 Sarekoppa Bangarappa, former chief minister of Karnataka
 N. M. Joseph, vice president of Janata Dal (Secular)
 D. Kupendra Reddy, Former MP of Rajya Sabha
 Mathew T. Thomas, former Kerala State president of Janata Dal (Secular) and former Kerala State minister
 Jose Thettayil, vice president of Janata Dal (Secular), former minister Govt. of Kerala.
 Neelalohithadasan Nadar, former Kerala State president of Janata Dal (Secular) (former minister Govt. of Kerala; former member of Parliament, Govt. of India)
 K. Krishnankutty, current Kerala State minister for water resources

List of chief ministers

Chief ministers of Karnataka

Deputy chief ministers of Karnataka

Electoral performance

Assembly election history in Karnataka

Assembly election history in Kerala

Lok Sabha election history in Karnataka

See also
 List of political parties in India
 Samata Party

References

 
State political parties in Kerala
Political parties in Karnataka
Political parties established in 1999
1999 establishments in India
Janata Parivar
Janata Dal